Holodiscus is a genus of flowering plants in the family Rosaceae, native to the Americas, from southwestern British Columbia, Canada and the western United States south to Bolivia.

Species
Seven to ten species are accepted by different authors, including:
Holodiscus australis western US (New Mexico; included in H. discolor by USDA)
Holodiscus argenteus Mexico
Holodiscus discolor (syn. H. boursieri) coastal western North America
Holodiscus dumosus interior western North America
Holodiscus fissus Central America
Holodiscus microphyllus western US (Nevada, Utah; included in H. discolor by USDA)
Holodiscus nitida Colombia
Holodiscus orizabae southern Mexico
Holodiscus pernethyoides Bolivia
Holodiscus saxicola western US (California; accepted by New York Botanical Gardens herbarium but not by USDA)

Taxonomy
The position of the genus Holodiscus in the family Rosaceae has changed over the last century as more detailed studies have been carried out. It has been place in subfamily Maloideae, but recent molecular evidence places all of (the former) subfamily Maloideae inside the subfamily Amygdaloideae.

References

External links
 USDA Plants Profile for Holodiscus (oceanspray)

 
Spiraeeae
Rosaceae genera